The following is a list of awards and nominations received by American actress Renée Zellweger. In 2004, Zellweger won the Academy Award, the Golden Globe, the BAFTA Award and the SAG Award for Best Supporting Actress in Cold Mountain. She received seven Golden Globe Award nominations, winning four for her performances in Nurse Betty (2000), Chicago (2002), Cold Mountain (2003), and Judy (2019). For her performance as Judy Garland in Judy, she won the Academy Award, the BAFTA Award, the SAG Award, and the Golden Globe for Best Actress.

Major associations

Academy Awards

British Academy Film Awards

Golden Globe Awards

Grammy Awards

Screen Actors Guild Awards

Other associations

Atlanta Film Critics Circle

AACTA International Awards

AARP's Movies For Grownups Awards

American Comedy Awards

Alliance of Women Film Journalists

Austin Film Critics Association

Awards Circuit Community Awards

British Independent Film Awards

Blockbuster Entertainment Awards

Central Ohio Film Critics Association

Chicago Film Critics Association

Critics' Choice Movie Awards

Dallas–Fort Worth Film Critics Association

Detroit Film Critics Society

Dorian Awards

Dublin Film Critics Circle

Empire Awards

Florida Film Critics Circle

Georgia Film Critics Association

Goldene Kamera

Hasty Pudding Theatricals

Hollywood Critics Association

Houston Film Critics Society

IndieWire Critics Poll

Independent Spirit Awards

Kansas City Film Critics Circle

London Film Critics' Circle

Mar del Plata International Film Festival

MTV Movie & TV Awards

Music City Film Critics Association

National Board of Review

National Society of Film Critics

New York Film Critics Circle

North Carolina Film Critics Association

Online Film Critics Society

Online Association of Female Film Critics

Palm Springs International Film Festival

Phoenix Film Critics Society

Russian Guild of Film Critics

San Diego Film Critics Society

Santa Barbara International Film Festival

Satellite Awards

Saturn Awards

Seattle Film Critics Society

Southeastern Film Critics Association

St. Louis Gateway Film Critics Association

Teen Choice Awards

Telluride Film Festival

Texas Film Awards

Toronto Film Critics Association

Visual Effects Society

Washington D.C. Area Film Critics Association

Women Film Critics Circle

Women in Film Crystal + Lucy Awards

References

External links
 

Zellweger, Renee